No For an Answer was a Californian hardcore punk band active primarily between 1987 and 1989.  The band has also done a couple of reunion shows, most notably the Revelation 25th anniversary shows in California.

Members
 Casey Jones (1987–1988, 2009–present) – drums
 John Mastropaulo (1987–1988, 2009–present) – bass
 Gavin Oglesby (1987–present) – guitar
 Dan O'Mahony (1987–present) – vocals

Past members
 Jeff Boetto (1987) – bass
 Chris Bratton (1988–1989) – drums
 Zack de la Rocha (1988) – drums
 Rob Haworth (1988) – guitar
 Quinn Millard (1988) – drums
 Sterling Wilson (1988–1989) – bass
 Joe Foster (1989) – guitar (one show)

Discography 
 "You Laugh" EP (1988) Revelation Records
 "A Thought Crusade" (1989) Hawker/Roadrunner Records
 "It Makes Me Sick" (2011) TKO Records
 "No for an Answer / Carry Nation – A Thought Crusade / Face The Nation" (CD, Comp) (1996) Cargo Music/Tacklebox Records

Hardcore punk groups from California
Musical groups from Orange County, California
Revelation Records artists